Glenn McMorris is a retired kickboxer, a former Professional Karate Association Full-Contact Middleweight United States Champion, a sport karate Hall of Famer, and the only fighter to have knocked out Martial Arts Hall of Famer Don "The Dragon" Wilson.

Sport Karate

Glenn McMorris started in martial arts competition in sport karate. He fought in numerous point-fighting matches which earned him a place in the Sport Karate Hall of Fame. One of McMorris's rare defeats in point-fighting was to Harold "Nature Boy" Roth in New Orleans in 1975.

McMorris appeared on the cover of the magazine Karate Illustrated in July 1979 (Vol.10, Number 7).

Kickboxing
McMorris branched off into kickboxing. He had an early reputation in the WSMAC (World Series of the Martial Arts Championships) as a knockout artist; knocking out "Big" Macon Taylor in 15 seconds. McMorris possessed a great right hand, but he didn't have much of a defense.

McMorris was billed as the number 1 contender for the Professional Karate Association (PKA) Middleweight U.S. Title in March 1980.

McMorris challenged Don "The Dragon" Wilson for the PKA Full-Contact Middleweight U.S. Title on 5 March 1980. McMorris had a record of 9–6 (8 knockouts) going into the title fight, while Wilson was 25-3-1 and was riding a 2-year, 17 bout winning streak. McMorris scored a stunning upset by knocking out Wilson in the first round to capture the title. This would be the only knockout defeat suffered by Wilson in his 6-decade career.

Four months later, McMorris lost the PKA Full-Contact Middleweight U.S. Title to Ray McCallum by 2nd-round knockout.

Next, McMorris attempted a comeback and was knocked out by Robert Biggs.

On 24 February 1981, McMorris met PKA World Lightheavyweight Champion Jean-Yves Theriault in a non-title match. In a brutal slugfest, McMorris lost by knockout in the 6th round. McMorris retired after this bout.

Kickboxing record

Karate Point Fighting record

Full-Contact Karate Record

Footnotes

Living people
American male karateka
American male kickboxers
People from Baton Rouge, Louisiana
Date of birth missing (living people)
Year of birth missing (living people)